Johnny Summers may refer to:

Johnny Summers (footballer) (1927–1962), footballer for Charlton Athletic
Johnny Summers (boxer) (1882–1946), English boxer

See also
John Summers (disambiguation)